Černí myslivci is a 1945 Czech drama film directed by Martin Frič.

Cast
 Terezie Brzková
 Dana Medřická as Zofka
 Gustav Nezval as Knizeci myslivec Jiri
 Jaroslav Průcha

References

External links
 

1945 films
1945 drama films
1940s Czech-language films
Czechoslovak black-and-white films
Films directed by Martin Frič
Czechoslovak drama films
1940s Czech films